Bijapur (Vijayapura) is one of the 28 Lok Sabha (parliamentary) constituencies in Karnataka state in southern India. This constituency is reserved for the candidates belonging to the Scheduled castes.

Assembly segments
Bijapur Lok Sabha constituency presently comprises the following eight Legislative Assembly segments:

Members of Parliament

Election results

General election 2019

General election 2014

See also
 Vijayapura district, Karnataka
 List of Constituencies of the Lok Sabha

References

Lok Sabha constituencies in Karnataka
Bijapur district, Karnataka